Franz Ritter von Keil (1862–1945) was an Austrian naval officer during World War I. He served as Emperor Charles I's senior naval adviser at the close of the war. The position was a sinecure, as the Emperor did not take advice and the navy did not take to sea.

Von Keil's parents were lieutenant field marshal Heinrich Ritter von Keil and Georgina Maria Brentano (1842–1867). He had one daughter, Herta von Keil Cima (1891–1971).

References 

1862 births
1945 deaths
Austrian knights
Austro-Hungarian Navy officers
Austro-Hungarian military personnel of World War I